Merano (German Meran) is a spa city and comune in South Tyrol, northern Italy.

Merano may also refer to:
Surname
 Francesco Merano (1619–1657) Italian painter
 Giovanni Battista Merano (1632-1698) Italian painter
 Michelangelo Merano (1867–?) Italian painter

Sport
 HC Merano, ice hockey team
 Merano Cup, figure skating competition
 Merano Open, tennis tournament
 Gran Premio Merano, horse race

Other
 "Merano", choral piece from Chess (musical)

Similar spellings
 Marano (disambiguation)
 Murano (disambiguation)
 Meran (disambiguation)